Alfie Frank Gleadall (born 28 May 2000) is an English cricketer. He made his List A debut for Derbyshire against South Africa A on 29 May 2017. He made his first-class debut for Derbyshire against Durham on 9 June 2018 in the 2018 County Championship.

References

External links
 

2000 births
Living people
English cricketers
Derbyshire cricketers
Cricketers from Chesterfield, Derbyshire
English cricketers of the 21st century